Andecha Astur (Asturian for: Asturian Group) is an Asturian nationalist leftist political party of Spain.

History

The party was founded in 1990. From 2003 to 2007 they had two councilmen, one in Riosa and the other in Carreño which they lost in 2007 elections. Current days Andecha Astur is working with some other nationalist parties of Spain.

Ideology

Andecha Astur stands for:

The recognition of Asturias as a nation.
The right to self-determination.
The recognition of the Asturian language as a national language of Asturias.
The rights of the working class.
Socialism.
Emphasis on ecology.

Youth
The youth wing of Andecha Astur is since 2004 Darréu-mocedá nacionaliego (nationalistic youth).

Electoral performance

General Junta of the Principality of Asturias

External links
Official site (in Asturian)

Political parties in Asturias
Asturian nationalist parties
Socialist parties in Spain
Ahora Repúblicas